Darrel Darnell Petties (born December 17, 1983) is an American gospel musician, worship leader and pastor. He performs urban contemporary gospel and traditional black gospel. He performs with his choir, Strength in Praise. His first album was Count It All Joy, released in 2006, from EMI Gospel. Two songs from the album, "Yes Lord" and "Thank Ya Jesus", charted on the Billboard magazine Gospel Songs chart. Two songs also appeared on the WOW Gospel Albums: in 2005, "Glory Hallelujah", and in 2007, "Thank Ya Jesus".

Early life
Darrel Darnell Petties was born on December 17, 1983, He was raised in Memphis, Tennessee, the grandson and son of pastors and worship leaders.

Career
His began recording in 2005, with the song "Yes Lord". It was released as a single and charted on Billboard Gospel Songs at No. 15. Count It All Joy was released on April 1, 2006, with EMI Gospel. The second song, "Thank Ya Jesus", peaked at No. 6 on the Gospel Songs chart. The songs, "Glory Hallelujah" and "Thank Ya Jesus", appeared on the WOW Gospel Albums in 2005 and 2007.

Personal life
He lives in the Memphis, Tennessee-area, where he is the pastor at Mount Pisgah Missionary Baptist Church, in Olive Branch, Mississippi.

Discography
Count It All Joy (April 1, 2006, EMI Gospel)
 ‘New Season’ ( December 17, 2018, ASCAP/SIPMusic)
Singles

References

External links
Facebook profile

1983 births
Living people
African-American Christians
Musicians from Memphis, Tennessee
Songwriters from Tennessee
People from Olive Branch, Mississippi
African-American songwriters
21st-century African-American people
20th-century African-American people